Merchants National Bank may refer to:
Merchants' National Bank in Grinnell, Iowa
Merchants National Bank (Saint Paul) in Minnesota, also known as the McColl Building
Merchants National Bank (Winona, Minnesota)
Merchants National Bank (Kittanning, Pennsylvania), now known as Farmers & Merchants Bank of Western Pennsylvania
Merchants National Bank and Annex in Indianapolis, Indiana, known as the Barnes and Thornburg Building
Merchants National Bank and Trust Company of Indianapolis
Merchants' National Bank Building (1895), Baltimore in Maryland
Merchants' National Bank of New York, founded in New York City in April 1803